Aurangabad Assembly constituency is an assembly constituency for Bihar Legislative Assembly in Aurangabad district, Bihar. It comes under Aurangabad (Bihar Lok Sabha constituency). Before Anand Shankar Singh, Ramdhar Singh from BJP was MLA from this constituency.

Members of Legislative Assembly

Election results

2020

References

External links
 

Assembly constituencies of Bihar